Jerzy Kowalski (born 27 February 1937) is a Polish sprinter. He competed in the men's 400 metres at the 1960 Summer Olympics.

References

External links
 

1937 births
Living people
Athletes (track and field) at the 1960 Summer Olympics
Polish male sprinters
Olympic athletes of Poland
Place of birth missing (living people)
Zawisza Bydgoszcz athletes